In the siege of Ciudad Rodrigo, Spain, (7–20 January 1812) the Viscount Wellington's Anglo-Portuguese Army besieged the city's French garrison under General of Brigade Jean Léonard Barrié. After two breaches were blasted in the walls by British heavy artillery, the fortress was successfully stormed on the evening of 19 January 1812. After breaking into the city, British troops went on a rampage for several hours before order was restored. Wellington's army suffered casualties of about 1,700 men including two generals killed. Strategically, the fall of the fortress opened the northern gateway into French-dominated Spain from British-held Portugal. An earlier siege of Ciudad Rodrigo occurred in 1810 when the French captured the city from Spanish forces.

Background
The allied campaign in Spain started with the Siege of Ciudad Rodrigo.

Preliminary operations

As part of his strategy in Spain, Napoleon ordered Marshal Auguste Marmont to send 10,000 troops to help Marshal Louis Suchet's forces capture Valencia and 4,000 more to reinforce the central reserve. When Wellington received news that Marmont's Army of Portugal sent forces eastward, he moved in bad snowstorm conditions, on Ciudad Rodrigo and arrived in the area on 6 January, with Wellington surveying the approaches with the chief engineer Lt. Col. Fletcher CRE next morning.

Barrié's 2,000-man garrison was far too weak to properly man the defences. The French garrison included single battalions of the 34th Light and 113th Line Infantry Regiments, a platoon of sappers and only 167 artillerists to man 153 cannons.

The fortress was invested, and on the night of 8 January, the Light Division stormed and took the Grand Teson redoubt by surprise. and began digging trenches to, and positions for, the breaching batteries. Digging in the rocky soil at night caused a peculiar hazard. When a pickaxe struck a stone, the resulting spark drew accurate French fire. By 12 January the trenches to battery positions were complete and the batteries were being installed. Wellington received a message concerning Marshal Marmont's movements and decided the siege must be undertaken rapidly. The Santa Cruz Convent, to the right, was stormed on 13 January by the KGL and one company of the 60th. The defenders made a vigorous sortie at 11am on 14 January with 500 men, as the troops were being relieved, this sortie was repulsed, and that night an escalade was mounted against the San Francisco Convent, on the left, by men from the 40th Regiment of Foot which was successful, all French troops falling back inside the town walls. The batteries, which opened fire at 4pm on 14 January, included thirty-four 24-pound and four 18-pound siege cannon. Work began on the second parallel, to provide closer batteries and a safe covered route for assaulting troops. In five days, the guns fired over 9,500 rounds and opened two effective breaches, one, called the great breach in a wall and a smaller one in an exposed tower. Wellington ordered an assault for the night of 19 January.

The storm

Major-General Thomas Picton's 3rd Division was ordered to storm the greater breach on the northwest while Robert Craufurd's Light Division was sent against the lesser breach on the north. Diversionary attacks by Denis Pack's Portuguese brigade would probe the defences at the San Pelayo Gate on the east and across the Agueda River on the south. All told, Wellington planned to use 10,700 men in his assault.

Launched at 7 pm, the assault met determined resistance in the great breach. The men assaulting the small breach had fewer problems and managed to get through the wall and behind the defenders of the great breach, making further resistance hopeless, the assault was completely successful. There had been two cannons embedded in the wall of the greater breach that caused most casualties in the storming. The 88th Connaught Rangers Regiment took one of the guns while the 45th Nottinghamshire Regiment took the other. Allied losses in the assault were 195 killed and 916 wounded, although amongst the dead were Major-Generals Henry MacKinnon and Robert Craufurd. The victory was somewhat marred when the British rank and file, who were upset by the 562 casualties suffered during the storming of the town, thoroughly sacked the city, despite the efforts of their officers and the fact the civilians were Spanish and therefore allies of the British.

Strategic consequences

The French garrison lost 529 killed and wounded, while the rest were captured. The French Army of Portugal lost its entire siege train among the 153 captured cannon. The rapid loss of Ciudad Rodrigo badly upset the calculations of Marmont who believed the town would hold for three weeks, which would give him enough time to concentrate a relief force at Salamanca. It fell in less than two weeks and Marmont, with his 32,000 troops, decided not to try to recapture it as he needed the troops to defend other towns and fortresses.

Wellington received an earldom and a generous pension from the British. The Spanish made him Duque de Ciudad Rodrigo.

The capture of Ciudad Rodrigo opened up the possibility of a northern invasion corridor from Portugal into Spain. It also allowed Wellington to proceed to Badajoz on the southern corridor, whose taking would be a much more bloody affair.

Aftermath
The allied campaign in Spain proceeded with the Siege of Badajoz.

Notes

References

Further reading

External links
 http://ciudadrodrigo.ueuo.com/
 

Sieges of the Napoleonic Wars
Sieges of the Peninsular War
Battles in Castile and León
Siege of Ciudad Rodrigo (1812)
King's German Legion
Sieges involving France
Sieges involving Portugal
Sieges involving the United Kingdom
Sieges involving Spain
January 1812 events
History of the province of Salamanca
Arthur Wellesley, 1st Duke of Wellington
Massacres in Spain
Massacres committed by the United Kingdom
Massacres in 1812